Mylett is a surname. Notable people with the surname include:

 Jeffrey Mylett (1949–1986), American actor and songwriter
 Michelle Mylett (born 1989), Canadian actress
 Rose Mylett (died 1888), English murder victim

See also
 Mylett Road Section, geographical feature in Wales
 Mynett, surname